Methyl acetate, also known as MeOAc, acetic acid methyl ester or methyl ethanoate, is a carboxylate ester with the formula CH3COOCH3. It is a flammable liquid with a characteristically pleasant smell reminiscent of some glues and nail polish removers.   Methyl acetate is occasionally used as a solvent, being weakly polar and lipophilic, but its close relative ethyl acetate is a more common solvent being less toxic and less soluble in water.   Methyl acetate has a solubility of 25% in water at room temperature.  At elevated temperature its solubility in water is much higher.  Methyl acetate is not stable in the presence of strong aqueous bases or aqueous acids. Methyl acetate is not considered a VOC in the USA.

Preparation and reactions
Methyl acetate is produced industrially via the carbonylation of methanol as a byproduct of the production of acetic acid. Methyl acetate also arises by esterification of acetic acid with methanol in the presence of strong acids such as sulfuric acid; this production process is famous because of Eastman Kodak's intensified process using a reactive distillation.

Reactions
In the presence of strong bases such as sodium hydroxide or strong acids such as hydrochloric acid or sulfuric acid it is hydrolyzed back into methanol and acetic acid, especially at elevated temperature.  The conversion of methyl acetate back into its components, by an acid, is a first-order reaction with respect to the ester. The reaction of methyl acetate and a base, for example sodium hydroxide, is a second-order reaction with respect to both reactants.

Methyl acetate is a Lewis base that forms 1:1 adducts  with a variety of Lewis acids. It is classified as a hard base and is a base in the ECW model with EB =1.63 and CB = 0.95.

Applications
A major use of methyl acetate is as a volatile low toxicity solvent in glues, paints, and nail polish removers.

Acetic anhydride is produced by carbonylation of methyl acetate in a process that was inspired by the Monsanto acetic acid synthesis.

See also
 Ethyl acetate

References

Methyl esters
Ester solvents
Acetate esters
Sweet-smelling chemicals